Stigmella oa is a moth of the family Nepticulidae. It is only known from Honshu in Japan.

External links
Japanese Species Of The Genus Stigmella (Nepticulidae: Lepidoptera)

Nepticulidae
Moths of Japan
Moths described in 1985